Maria Saadeh (born 16 July 1974) is a Syrian architect, politician, and developer. Born in Damascus, Syria, she lived an independent life after the passing of her father in 1980, when she was aged 6.

In 1997, she got a diploma in Architecture from University of Aleppo. In 1998, she got a specialized diploma in Architectural Design, specializing in "historical advancement of Syrian Churches Architecture".

In 1999–2000, she established her firm PAA for architecture, interior design and restoration and conservation studies. Between 2001–2011 she taught Architectural Design at the University of Damascus, in the faculty of Architecture. Between 2006–2010 Saadeh prepared her doctorate study in Contemporary Interventions in Historical Monuments and Sites at the University of Geneva. She worked as an expert in the field of restoration and conservation. She won several local and international competitions and was elected as member of the parliament of Syria from 2012 until 2016: she worked with regard to Syrian society as well as on an international level, defending Syria's sovereignty and the rights of the Syrian people; she participated in local and international conferences, did research and published articles and interviews, besides organizing workshops and conferences in political, social, cultural, and architectural domains.

In 2020, she founded her Nonprofit Association for Social Development "Houna Hawyati", focusing on enhancing the Syrian identity on social, economic and cultural levels.

References 

21st-century Syrian women politicians
21st-century Syrian politicians
Members of the People's Assembly of Syria
1974 births
Living people
Women architects